Harirampur High School is a secondary school in Parbatipur Upazila, Dinajpur District, Bangladesh.

References

High schools in Bangladesh
Parbatipur Upazila